Trypanaresta scutellata is a species of tephritid or fruit flies in the genus Trypanaresta of the family Tephritidae.

Distribution
Ecuador, Peru, Bolivia, Chile, Argentina.

References

Tephritinae
Insects described in 1933
Diptera of South America